James Allenby-Kirk or simply James Kirk (born 1988) is a Scottish actor, comedian and writer. He is perhaps best known for his roles as Jeff the Chef in the comedy Gary: Tank Commander and as Stosh in the drama series 24: Live Another Day.

Career
Born in Paisley, just outside Glasgow, he was educated at Williamsburgh Primary and Paisley Grammar School. He later attended Langside College, studying acting and performance. Kirk made his breakthrough into the comedy circuit by winning the "So You Think You're Funny?" competition in 2010. His first television appearance came in 2010, when he played Malky in Rab C. Nesbitt. He also appeared in Channel 4's "Comedy Blaps" series, in which he wrote and starred in the short online sketches "Kronicles of Kirk."  However, it was in Greg McHugh's BAFTA award winning sitcom Gary: Tank Commander, in which he played Jeff the Chef, that he was brought to the attention of a wider audience.

Following appearances in television shows such as Bob Servant Independent and the TV film "Two Doors Down", he starred in two comedies for BBC Scotland. The first, entitled "Scot Squad" came as a result of a successful pilot episode in late 2012. The first series of the show aired in late 2014. Kirk also worked on the comedy "How Do I Get Up There?" alongside his co-stars Chris Forbes and Kevin Mains, which was shown in Scotland during November 2014.

Television
River City (2020-2021)
Outlander (2017-2018) - Hayes - Season 4-5, 9 episodes  
How Do I Get up There? (2014)
Scot Squad (2014-)
Don't Drop the Baton (2014) 
Bob Servant (2013)
Gary Tank Commander (2011–12)
Pramface (2012)
Rab C. Nesbitt (2010)
Chewin' The Fat (1999-2005)

Radio Work
Only an Excuse
The Ellis and Clarke Show
All the Milkman's Children

Awards
Winner: So You Think You're Funny? (2010)
Nominated: Best Scottish Comedian, Scottish Variety Awards (2011, 2012)

References

Scottish male stage actors
Scottish male television actors
Living people
People from Paisley, Renfrewshire
1988 births
Scottish male comedians
21st-century Scottish male actors